Swarnapitha is one of the four Kamarupa Pithas, the geographical divisions of ancient Kamarupa.

Boundaries
Sources define the  boundaries of Swarnapitha as the area between the Rupali River and  the Bharali River.

See also
 Kamapitha
 Ratnapitha

References

Kamarupa (former kingdom)